Putrakameshti is a special yajna performed in Hinduism for the sake of bearing children. It is classified under a series of rituals called the kamya-karma.

Literature 
In the ancient Indian epic Ramayana, upon the recommendation of Sage Vashishta, King Dasharatha of Ayodhya performed the Putrakameshti Yajna under the supervision of Rishyashringa, an expert in Yajurveda, which has the guidelines for this yajna. After its successful completion, the god of fire, Agni, appeared and gave a bowl of payasam to the King of Ayodhya, which was provided to his three queens in order to promulgate his sons Rama, Lakshmana, Bharata, and Shatrughna.

Reference

External links 
 Guide to Putrakameshti Homam

Yajna